Bal Hukmi is a village in Nakodar in Jalandhar district of Punjab State, India. It is located 4.5 km from Nakodar, 37.2 km from Kapurthala, 28.2 km from district headquarter Jalandhar and 149 km from state capital Chandigarh. The village is administrated by a sarpanch who is an elected representative of village as per Panchayati raj (India).

Transport 
Nakodar railway station is the nearest train station however, Phagwara Junction train station is 37.3 km away from the village. The village is 67 km away from domestic airport in Ludhiana and the nearest international airport is located in Chandigarh also Sri Guru Ram Dass Jee International Airport is the second nearest airport which is 112 km away in Amritsar.

References 

Villages in Jalandhar district
Villages in Nakodar tehsil